Frank Rosendahl Kristensen Michalski (born 10 March 1977) is a Danish football coach and former professional player who played as a forward.

He is nicknamed Farlige Frank ("Dangerous Frank").

References

External links

Career statistics

1977 births
Living people
People from Thisted Municipality
Sportspeople from the North Jutland Region
Danish men's footballers
Association football forwards
Denmark under-21 international footballers
FC Midtjylland players
Danish Superliga players
Ikast FS players
Randers FC players